Twenty20 (T20) is a shortened game format of cricket. At the professional level, it was introduced by the England and Wales Cricket Board (ECB) in 2003 for the inter-county competition. In a Twenty20 game, the two teams have a single innings each, which is restricted to a maximum of 20 overs. Together with first-class and List A cricket, Twenty20 is one of the three current forms of cricket recognised by the International Cricket Council (ICC) as being at the highest international or domestic level.

A typical Twenty20 game is completed in about two and a half hours, with each innings lasting around 70 minutes and an official 10-minute break between the innings. This is much shorter than previous forms of the game, and is closer to the timespan of other popular team sports. It was introduced to create a fast-paced game that would be attractive to spectators at the ground and viewers on television.

The game has succeeded in spreading around the cricket world. On most international tours there is at least one Twenty20 match and all Test-playing nations have a domestic cup competition.

History

Origins

When the Benson & Hedges Cup ended in 2002, the ECB needed another one-day competition to fill its place. Cricketing authorities were looking to boost the game's popularity with the younger generation in response to dwindling crowds and reduced sponsorship. It was intended to deliver fast-paced, exciting cricket accessible to thousands of fans who were put off by the longer versions of the game. Stuart Robertson, the marketing manager of the ECB, proposed a 20-over-per-innings game, invented by New Zealand cricketer Martin Crowe, to county chairmen in 2001 and they voted 11–7 in favour of adopting the new format.

The first official Twenty20 matches were played on 13 June 2003 between the English counties in the Twenty20 Cup. The first season of Twenty20 in England was a relative success, with the Surrey Lions defeating the Warwickshire Bears by nine wickets in the final to claim the title. The first Twenty20 match held at Lord's, on 15 July 2004 between Middlesex and Surrey, attracted a crowd of 27,509, the highest attendance for any county cricket game at the ground – other than a one-day final – since 1953.

Spread worldwide
Thirteen teams from different parts of the country participated in Pakistan's inaugural competition in 2004, with the Faisalabad Wolves the first winners. On 12 January 2005 Australia's first Twenty20 game was played at the WACA Ground between the Western Warriors and the Victorian Bushrangers. It drew a sell-out crowd of 20,000, which was the first one in nearly 25 years.

Starting on 11 July 2006, 19 West Indies regional teams competed in what was named the Stanford 20/20 tournament. The event was financially backed by billionaire Allen Stanford, who gave at least US$28,000,000 in funding money. It was intended that the tournament would be an annual event. Guyana won the inaugural event, defeating Trinidad and Tobago by five wickets, securing US$1,000,000 in prize money.

On 5 January 2007 the Queensland Bulls played the New South Wales Blues at The Gabba, Brisbane. An unexpected 16,000 fans turned up on the day to buy tickets, causing Gabba staff to throw open gates and grant many fans free entry. Attendance reached 27,653. For the February 2008 Twenty20 match between Australia and India, 85,824 people attended the match at the Melbourne Cricket Ground, involving the Twenty20 World Champions against the ODI World Champions.

The Stanford Super Series was held in October 2008 between the three teams.  The respective winners of the English and Caribbean Twenty20 competitions, Middlesex and Trinidad and Tobago, and a Stanford Superstars team formed from West Indies domestic players. Trinidad and Tobago won the competition, securing US$280,000 prize money. On 1 November, the Stanford Superstars played England in what was expected to be the first of five fixtures in as many years with the winner claiming US$20,000,000 in each match. The Stanford Superstars won the first match, but no further fixtures were held as Allen Stanford was charged with fraud in 2009.

T20 leagues

Several T20 leagues started after the popularity of the 2007 ICC World Twenty20. The Board of Control for Cricket in India started the Indian Premier League, which is now the largest cricket league, in 2008, which utilizes the North American sports franchise system with ten teams in major Indian cities. In September 2017, the broadcasting and digital rights for the next five years (2018–2022) of the IPL were sold to Star India for US$2.55 billion, making it one of the world's most lucrative sports league per match. The IPL has seen a spike in its brand valuation to US$5.3 billion after the 10th edition, according to global valuation and corporate finance advisor Duff & Phelps.

The Big Bash League, Bangladesh Premier League, Pakistan Super League, Caribbean Premier League, and Afghanistan Premier League started thereafter, following similar formulae, and remained popular with the fans. The Women's Big Bash League was started in 2015 by Cricket Australia, while the Kia Super League was started in England and Wales in 2016. The Mzansi Super League in South Africa was started in 2018.

Several T20 leagues follow the general format of having a group stage followed by a Page playoff system among the top four teams where:
 The first- and second-highest placed teams in the group stage face off, with the winner going to the final.
 The third- and fourth-place teams face off, with the loser being eliminated.
 The two teams who have not yet made it to the final after the above two matches have been played face off to fill the second berth in the final.

In the Big Bash League, there is an additional match to determine which of the fourth- or fifth-placed teams will qualify to be in the top four.

Twenty20 Internationals

The first Twenty20 International match was held on 5 August 2004 between the England and New Zealand women's teams, with New Zealand winning by nine runs.

On 17 February 2005 Australia defeated New Zealand in the first men's international Twenty20 match, played at Eden Park in Auckland. The game was played in a light-hearted manner – both sides turned out in kit similar to that worn in the 1980s, the New Zealand team's a direct copy of that worn by the Beige Brigade. Some of the players also sported moustaches or beards and hairstyles popular in the 1980s, taking part in a competition amongst themselves for "best retro look", at the request of the Beige Brigade. Australia won the game comprehensively, and as the result became obvious towards the end of the NZ innings, the players and umpires took things less seriously: Glenn McGrath jokingly replayed the Trevor Chappell underarm incident from a 1981 ODI between the two sides, and Billy Bowden showed him a mock red card (red cards are not normally used in cricket) in response.

The first Twenty20 international in England was played between England and Australia at the Rose Bowl in Hampshire on 13 June 2005, which England won by a margin of 100 runs, a record victory which lasted until 2007.

On 9 January 2006 Australia and South Africa met in the first international Twenty20 game in Australia. In a first, each player's nickname appeared on the back of his uniform, rather than his surname. The international match drew a crowd of 38,894 people at The Gabba.

On 16 February 2006 New Zealand defeated West Indies in a tie-breaking bowl-out 3–0; 126 runs were scored apiece in the game proper. The game was the last international match played by Chris Cairns.

The ICC has declared that it sees T20 as the optimal format for globalizing the game, and in 2018, announced that it will give international status to all T20 cricket matches played between its member nations. This resulted in a significant leap in the number of T20I matches played across the world.

Twenty20 World Cup 

Every two years an ICC World Twenty20 tournament is to take place, except in the event of an ICC Cricket World Cup being scheduled in the same year, in which case it will be held the year before. The first tournament was in 2007 in South Africa where India defeated Pakistan in the final. Two Associate teams had played in the first tournament, selected through the 2007 ICC World Cricket League Division One, a 50-over competition. In December 2007 it was decided to hold a qualifying tournament with a 20-over format to better prepare the teams. With six participants, two would qualify for the 2009 World Twenty20 and would each receive $250,000 in prize money. The second tournament was won by Pakistan, who beat Sri Lanka by eight wickets in England on 21 June 2009. The 2010 ICC World Twenty20 tournament was held in the West Indies in May 2010, where England defeated Australia by seven wickets. The 2012 ICC World Twenty20 was won by the West Indies, by defeating Sri Lanka at the finals. It was the first time in cricket history when a T20 World Cup tournament took place in an Asian country. The 2014 ICC World Twenty20 was won by Sri Lanka, by defeating India at the finals, where the tournament was held in Bangladesh. The 2016 ICC World Twenty20 was won by West Indies. In July 2020, the ICC announced that both the 2020 and 2021 editions had been postponed by one year due to the COVID-19 pandemic.

In June 2021, the ICC expanded the Twenty20 World Cup from 16 to 20 teams starting from the 2024 edition onwards.

Impact on the game

Twenty20 cricket is claimed to have resulted in a more athletic and explosive form of cricket. Indian fitness coach Ramji Srinivasan declared in an interview with the Indian fitness website Takath.com that Twenty20 had "raised the bar" in terms of fitness levels for all players, demanding higher levels of strength, speed, agility and reaction time from all players regardless of role in the team. Matthew Hayden credited retirement from international cricket with aiding his performance in general and fitness in particular in the Indian Premier League.

In June 2009, speaking at the annual Cowdrey Lecture at Lord's, former Australian wicketkeeper Adam Gilchrist pushed for Twenty20 to be made an Olympic sport. "It would," he said, "be difficult to see a better, quicker or cheaper way of spreading the game throughout the world." In a similar vein, several commentators have noted that the T20 format has been embraced by many Associate members of the ICC partly because it is more financially viable to play.

Former Australian captain Ricky Ponting, on the other hand, has criticized Twenty20 as being detrimental to Test cricket and for hampering batsmen's scoring skills and concentration. Former Australian captain Greg Chappell made similar complaints, fearing that young players would play too much T20 and not develop their batting skills fully, while former England player Alex Tudor feared the same for bowling skills.

Former West Indies captains Clive Lloyd, Michael Holding and Garfield Sobers criticised Twenty20 for its role in discouraging players from representing their test cricket national side, with many West Indies players like Chris Gayle, Sunil Narine and Dwayne Bravo preferring instead to play in a Twenty20 franchise elsewhere in the world and make far more money.

Match format and rules

Format
Twenty20 match format is a form of limited overs cricket in that it involves two teams, each with a single innings. The key feature is that each team bats for a maximum of 20 overs (120 legal balls). The batting team members do not arrive from and depart to traditional dressing rooms, but come and go from a bench (typically a row of chairs) visible in the playing arena, analogous to association football's technical area or a baseball dugout.

General rules
The Laws of cricket apply to Twenty20, with major exceptions:

 Each bowler may bowl a maximum of only one-fifth of the total overs per innings. For a full, uninterrupted match, this is four overs.
If a bowler delivers a no-ball by overstepping the crease, it costs one or two runs (depending on the competition) and their next delivery is designated a "free-hit". In this circumstance the batter can only be dismissed through a run out, hitting the ball twice or obstructing the field.
 The following fielding restrictions apply:
 No more than five fielders can be on the leg side at any time.
 During the first six overs, a maximum of two fielders can be outside the 30-yard circle (this is known as the powerplay).
 After the first six overs, a maximum of five fielders can be outside the fielding circle.
 If the fielding team does not start to bowl their 20th over within 75 minutes, the batting side is credited an extra six runs for every whole over bowled after the 75-minute mark; the umpire may add more time to this if they believe the batting team is wasting time.

Tie deciders

Currently, if the match ends with the scores tied and there must be a winner, the tie is broken with a one-over-per-side Eliminator or Super Over:
Each team nominates three batsmen and one bowler to play a one-over-per-side "mini-match". The team which bats second in the match bats first in the Super Over. In turn, each side bats one over bowled by the one nominated opposition bowler, with their innings over if they lose two wickets before the over is completed. The side with the higher score from their Super Over wins.
If the Super Over also ends up in a tie, it is repeated until the tie is broken.

In the Australian domestic competition the Big Bash League, the Super Over is played slightly differently, with no two-wicket limit, and if the Super Over is also tied then a "countback" is used, with scores after the fifth ball for each team being used to determine the result. If it is still tied, then the countback goes to four balls, and so on. The latest Super Over to decide a match was between the Sydney Sixers and the Brisbane Heat on 25 January 2017, in the Big Bash League at the Brisbane Cricket Ground, with the Sixers winning 0/22 to 0/15 in the Super Over after tying on 164.

Tied Twenty20 matches were previously decided by a bowl-out.

International

Women's and men's Twenty20 Internationals have been played since 2004 and 2005 respectively. To date, 76 nations have played the format, including all Test-playing nations.

T20 International rankings

In November 2011, the ICC released the first Twenty20 International rankings for the men's game, based on the same system as the Test and ODI rankings. The rankings cover a two- to three-year period, with matches since the most recent 1 August weighted fully, matches in the preceding 12 months weighted two-thirds, and matches in the 12 months preceding that weighted one-third. To qualify for the rankings, teams must have played at least eight Twenty20 Internationals in the ranking period.

Until 2018, the ICC did not maintain a separate Twenty20 ranking for the women's game, instead aggregating performance over all three forms of the game into one overall women's teams ranking. However, in October, the ICC announced that the women's ranking would be split between ODIs and T20Is, and released both tables shortly thereafter.

Domestic professional T20 leagues

This is a list of the current Twenty20 domestic competitions in several of the leading cricket countries.

See also
 List of Twenty20 cricket records
 List of Twenty20 International records
 100-ball cricket
T10 cricket, the 10-over format of cricket
 Major League Cricket

References

External links

Cricinfo – Twenty20 records
IPL News 2021